Cinecittà is a station on the Rome Metro. It is on Line A and is located at the intersection of Via Tuscolana, Via di Torre Spaccata and Via delle Capannelle.

References

Rome Metro Line A stations
Railway stations opened in 1980
1980 establishments in Italy
Rome Q. XXIV Don Bosco
Rome Q. XXV Appio Claudio
Railway stations in Italy opened in the 20th century